Protorthida is an extinct order of Rhynchonellate brachiopods containing the taxa:

 Superfamily Protorthoidea
 Family Protorthidae
 Family Arctohedridae
 Family Leioriidae
 Superfamily Skenidioidea
 Family Skenidiidae

References

Rhynchonellata